The pair of athletes, two bronze figurines at the Delphi Archaeological Museum, remind vividly of the Pythian Games.

Description
In separate, free-standing cases in the middle of room 9 of the Delphi Archaeological Museum bronze statuettes are exhibited: a Corinthian figurine of a man wearing himation and playing the aulos (460–450 BC), a bronze incense-burner in the form of a "peplophoros", and two naked athletes dated to the same period and originating from Attica. One of the athletes holds a halter and a wreath (or strigil). These figurines constitute a proof of the Pythian Games, both athletic and musical, which took place in Delphi every four years.

References

External links
 Pair of athletes

Ancient Greek bronze statues of the classical period
Collection of the Delphi Archaeological Museum
Nude sculptures in Greece
Bronze sculptures in Greece
Sculptures of men in Greece